Apionichthys sauli is a species of sole in the family Achiridae. It was described by Robson Tamar da Costa Ramos in 2003. It inhabits the Orinoco and Meta rivers in South America.

The species epithet "sauli" was given in honour of William G. Saul, a former curator in the ichthyology department at the Academy of Natural Sciences of Drexel University in Philadelphia, credited as one of the collectors of the type material for the species.

References

Pleuronectiformes
Taxa named by Robson Tamar da Costa Ramos
Fish described in 2003